Exultant may refer to:

 Exultant (novel), a science-fiction novel
 USS Exultant (AM-441), an Aggressive-class minesweeper
 USS Exultant (AMc-79), an Accentor-class minesweeper